Kevin Andrés Agudelo Ardila (born 14 November 1998) is a Colombian professional footballer who plays as a midfielder for Italian Serie A club Spezia.

Career
On 2 August 2019, Agudelo joined Italian club Genoa.

On 31 January 2020, he moved on loan to Fiorentina. Fiorentina will be obligated to purchase his rights permanently if he makes a certain amount of appearances.

On 16 September 2020, Agudelo signed for Spezia on a season-long loan with option to buy.

Personal life 
In May 2020 he tested positive for COVID-19.

References

External links

1998 births
Living people
Colombian footballers
People from Putumayo Department
Association football midfielders
Categoría Primera A players
Categoría Primera B players
Bogotá FC footballers
Atlético Huila footballers
Genoa C.F.C. players
ACF Fiorentina players
Spezia Calcio players
Serie A players
Colombian expatriate footballers
Colombian expatriate sportspeople in Italy
Expatriate footballers in Italy